= The Devouring Gray =

2019 novel by Christine Lynn Herman

- Author: Christine Lynn Herman
- Language: English
- Genre: Young adult, paranormal, horror
- Publisher: Disney-Hyperion
- Publication date: April 2, 2019
- Pages: 368 pp

The Devouring Gray is a 2019 young adult novel written by Christine Lynn Herman.

== Plot ==
A parallel-dimension prison for an ancient evil is connected to a small town's founding families. Seventeen-year old Violet Saunders must uncover a devastating family history to defeat the evil known as the Beast.

== Critical reception ==
Kirkus Reviews said the novel had "Complex characters and creepy concepts will leave readers chomping for the next volume".

Publishers Weekly said "Herman imbues her setting with a claustrophobic atmosphere filled with intrigue...Herman creates distinct characters and an appealing mystery with an imminent sense of betrayal and tragedy that will keep readers awaiting the next volume."

In the cover reveal, Hypable stated that the novel promised "the character-driven drama of Riverdale and the creepiness of the Upside Down from Stranger Things."

The Devouring Gray was a Kids' Indie Next List Top Ten Pick for Spring 2019.

The Devouring Gray was an Indies Introduce Debut Pick for Winter/Spring 2019.

== Themes ==
The author has stated the book contains and discusses themes of mental health
